List of international organisations which have French as an official, administrative or working language.

Notes and references 

CISM
4 (Arabic, English, Spanish)	Conseil International du Sport Militaire	Brussels, Belgium

See also
 List of countries where French is an official language
 List of international organisations which have Portuguese as an official language
 Co-ordinated organisations: 6 organisations which all have French as official language. Many of the 26 "follower" organisations mentioned also have French as official language.

International organisations
International, French
French